Víctor García Raja (born 1 January 1997) is a Spanish professional footballer who plays as a right winger for AD Alcorcón.

Club career
García was born in Valencia, and represented CF Torre Levante as a youth. On 12 January 2014, aged just 17, he made his first-team debut by playing the last ten minutes in a 0–4 Tercera División away loss against UD Alzira.

García was definitely promoted to the main squad in 2016, and scored a career-best 11 goals during the 2017–18 campaign; highlights included a brace in a 3–0 home win against CD Almazora. On 12 June 2018, he signed a two-year contract with Deportivo de La Coruña and was assigned to the reserves in Segunda División B.

García made his professional debut on 12 September 2018, starting in a 1–2 away loss against Real Zaragoza, for the season's Copa del Rey. The following 26 July, he moved to another reserve team, Real Valladolid B also in the third division, on a two-year deal.

García made his main squad – and La Liga – on 7 July 2020, starting in a 1–2 away loss against Valencia CF. On 6 August, he extended his contract until 2023 and was loaned to Segunda División newcomers CE Sabadell FC for one year.

On 27 August 2021, García returned to Dépor on loan for one year, with the club now in Primera División RFEF. On 16 August of the following year, he moved to fellow league team AD Alcorcón on a permanent deal.

References

External links

1997 births
Living people
Footballers from Valencia (city)
Spanish footballers
Association football wingers
La Liga players
Segunda División players
Primera Federación players
Segunda División B players
Tercera División players
Deportivo Fabril players
Deportivo de La Coruña players
Real Valladolid Promesas players
Real Valladolid players
CE Sabadell FC footballers
AD Alcorcón footballers